Coburg City Oval (also currently known as Piranha Park due to naming rights) is an Australian rules football and cricket stadium located in Coburg, Australia. It is home to the Coburg Football Club in the Victorian Football League, and the Coburg Cricket Club.

The oval was officially opened in 1915. Following the Coburg Football Club's admission to the Victorian Football Association in 1925, the grandstand was constructed, and was officially opened in March 1926. In the late 1920s and early 1930s, the venue was one of the VFA's finals venues, and it hosted the final in 1932. It later hosted the 1967 Division 2 finals series.

In 1965, the VFL's North Melbourne Football Club moved its playing and training base from the Arden Street Oval to Coburg City Oval. The move was intended to be permanent, with some initial negotiations seeking long-term leases for up to 40 years, but it was ultimately cancelled after only eight months, and North Melbourne returned to the Arden Street Oval in 1966.

During the 1965 VFL season, Coburg City Oval attracted an average of 13,146 spectators to its nine games. A ground record was set in round 10 against , with a total attendance of 21,626. The ground's current capacity is around 15,000.

The oval is open to the citizens of Moreland and all others. The oval sits inside the wider G. A. Bridges Reserve, which includes a leisure centre, a bowls club and a former trugo club.

In 2018, following the efforts of the Coburg Football Club, and local residents the State Government of Victoria along with the City of Moreland announced a joint $6million investment into the redevelopment of the oval's grandstand and changerooms, set to commence in 2020 with further funding to be announced by both the Australian Football League and Cricket Australia.  Once completed, the venue will once again be a modern and Female friendly football and cricket facility. Once locked away from the citizens of Coburg, City Oval is now a true Peoples Ground.

References

Defunct Australian Football League grounds
Victorian Football League grounds
Sports venues in Melbourne
Buildings and structures in the City of Merri-bek
Sport in the City of Merri-bek